The 2019–20 Atlantic Coast Conference men's basketball season began with practices in October 2019, followed by the start of the 2019–20 NCAA Division I men's basketball season in November. Conference play started in late December 2019 and concluded in March with the 2020 ACC men's basketball tournament at the Greensboro Coliseum in Greensboro, North Carolina. The season marks 66th season of Atlantic Coast Conference basketball.

The post season was cut short due to the COVID-19 outbreak.  On March 12, the NCAA announced the tournament would be cancelled, along with all remaining winter and spring championships.  The ACC tournament was cancelled after the second round and the NCAA tournament and NIT were both cancelled before they began.

Head coaches

Coaching change 

In April, 2019, Virginia Tech head coach Buzz Williams accepted the head coaching job with Texas A&M. On April 7, 2019, the school hired Wofford head coach Mike Young as the new Virginia Tech head coach.

Coaches 

Notes:
 Year at school includes 2019–20 season.
 Overall and ACC records are from time at current school and are through the end the 2018–19 season.
 NCAA tournament appearances are from time at current school only.
 NCAA Final Fours and Championship include time at other schools

Preseason

Preseason watchlists
Below is a table of notable preseason watch lists.

Preseason polls

ACC Preseason Media Poll

The ACC Men's Basketball media preseason poll was released at Operation Basketball, hosted at the  Charlotte Marriott City Center in Charlotte, North Carolina on October 8, 2019.  Two members of each team, in addition to the team's head coaches were in attendance.  The preseason poll and preseason All-ACC Teams were voted on at Operation Basketball.  The results of the voting is shown below.

Preseason poll
First place votes shown in parenthesis.
 Duke (51)– 1,564
 North Carolina (19) – 1,493
 Louisville (29) – 1,448
 Virginia (12) – 1,405
 Florida State – 1,157
 NC State – 1,038
 Notre Dame – 915
 Syracuse – 910
 Miami – 768
 Pittsburgh – 577
 Clemson – 564
 Georgia Tech – 437
 Boston College – 382
 Virginia Tech – 334
 Wake Forest – 328

Preseason All-ACC teams

ACC preseason player of the year
Jordan Nwora – Louisville (55)
Cole Anthony – North Carolina (31)
Tre Jones – Duke (19)
John Mooney – Notre Dame (3)
Mamadi Diakite – Virginia (2)
Markell Johnson – NC State (1)

ACC preseason rookie of the year
Cole Anthony – North Carolina (89)
Vernon Carey Jr. – Duke (8)
Wendell Moore Jr. – Duke (5)
Casey Morsell – Virginia (3)
Cassius Stanley – Duke (3)
Matthew Hurt – Duke (3)

Regular season

Rankings

 Notes: The week 2 Coaches Poll was released on the same date as the week 3 AP poll.  No Coaches poll was released on the date when the week 2 AP Poll was released. The AP poll does not release a final poll after the NCAA tournament, where as the Coaches Poll does.Due to the cancellation of the NCAA and NIT Tournaments, the Coaches Poll did not release a final poll.

Conference matrix
This table summarizes the head-to-head results between teams in conference play. Each team will play 20 conference games, and at least 1 against each opponent. The 2019–2020 season marked the first year that the ACC played a 20-game conference slate.

Player of the week
Throughout the conference regular season, the Atlantic Coast Conference offices named one or two Players of the week and one or two Rookies of the week.

Records against other conferences
2019–20 records against non-conference foes through games played on December 30, 2019. Records shown for regular season only.

Postseason

ACC tournament

Due to ongoing concerns with the COVID-19 pandemic, officials announced that, initially, the tournament would only be played in front of essential tournament personnel, limited school administrators and student-athlete guests, broadcast television, and credentialed media members present, starting with the quarterfinals; however, shortly before the tipoff of the quarterfinal matchup between Florida State and Clemson, the ACC announced the tournament was canceled and Florida State, the regular season champions, would receive the conference's automatic bid to the NCAA tournament.

NCAA tournament

National Invitation tournament

Honors and awards

All-Americans

To earn "consensus" status, a player must win honors based on a point system computed from the four different all-America teams. The point system consists of three points for first team, two points for second team and one point for third team. No honorable mention or fourth team or lower are used in the computation. The top five totals plus ties are first team and the next five plus ties are second team.

ACC Awards

Source:

NBA draft

The ACC had a total of eight players selected in the 2020 NBA Draft.

Attendance

References